Aditya Raj Kapoor (born 1 July 1956) is an Indian film actor and filmmaker and retired businessman from the Kapoor family. He is the son of late actor Shammi Kapoor and actress Geeta Bali. Kapoor is best known for his work as an assistant director in several Hindi films and his English language directorial films like Shamaal, Don't Stop Dreaming (2007) and Sambar Salsa (2007). His company has developed amusement parks in Mumbai and Delhi.

Family 
Aditya Raj is the member of well known Kapoor family of Indian film industry. He was born to actor Shammi Kapoor and Geeta Bali. He is the grandson of actor Prithviraj Kapoor, cousin of actors Rishi Kapoor, Karan Kapoor, Randhir Kapoor and Rajiv Kapoor. He is uncle to actors Ranbir Kapoor, Karishma Kapoor and Kareena Kapoor. Aditya Raj Kapoor is married to Priti Kapoor and has two children, a son named Vishwapratap Raj Kapoor and  a daughter Tulsi Kapoor.

Career 
After finishing his school education, Kapoor started his professional career as an assistant director with his uncle Raj Kapoor for the 1973 romantic film Bobby and thereafter he worked as assistant director in films like Satyam Shivam Sundaram (1978), Geraftaar (1985), Saajan (1991), Dil Tera Aashiq (1993), Papi Gudia (1996) and Aarzoo (1999). After a hiatus from Bollywood, Kapoor made a comeback as writer and director of Don't Stop Dreaming and Sambar Salsa (both 2007).

Kapoor's first important role as an actor came with Jagmohan Mundhra's Chase (2010). Previously he had appeared in minor roles in Satyam Shivam Sundaram – where he was Shashi Kapoor's body double and Dil Tera Aashiq. Following Chase he played the role of a businessman who falls in love with a prostitute in Mumbai 118. Kapoor also starred in Diwangi Ne Had Kar Di (2010), Isi Life Mein (2010), Say Yes to Love (2012) and Yamla Pagla Deewana 2 (2011). In 2014 he participated in the bike-ride India Hai that covered several Indian states and some nearby countries like  Nepal and Bhutan. In the same year Kapoor appeared in the Ashutosh Gowariker-directed television series Everest. He also owns a truck and warehouse business. His construction company has developed the amusements parks Fantasy Land in Mumbai and Appu Ghar in Delhi.

Filmography

Director 
Don't Stop Dreaming (2007)
Sambar Salsa (2007)

Assistant Director 
Bobby (1973)
Satyam Shivam Sundaram (1978)
Geraftaar (1985)
Saajan (1991)
Dil Tera Aashiq (1993)
Papi Gudia (1996)
Aarzoo (1999)

Actor 
Chase (2010)
Mumbai 118 (2010)
Diwangi Ne Had Kar Di (2010)
Isi Life Mein (2010)
Yamla Pagla Deewana 2 (2011)
Say Yes to Love (2012)
Everest (television series)

References

External links 
 Aditya Raj Kapoor's Official Blog
 

Living people
Male actors in Hindi cinema
Male actors from Mumbai
Film directors from Mumbai
Film producers from Mumbai
Hindi-language film directors
Punjabi people
Aditya Raj
1956 births